Abedah Ritchie (born Kristin Nicole Ritchie; May 6, 1986), is a former Nerdcore rapper, better known by the stage name MC Router.  In 2009 she worked in the Netherlands under the new stage name Krisje before leaving hip hop altogether.  Ritchie later converted to Islam, changing her given name to Abedah, and became a translator.

Hip hop career
Ritchie, as the self-proclaimed "First Lady of Nerdcore" founded the group "1337 g33k b34t" with friend Tanner Brown (aka "T-Byte") in 2004. Although the two are still friends and occasionally collaborate musically, the group disbanded in late 2006 to leave each of them to perform as solo acts. Late 2006 also marked the birth of "Tri-forc3", a joint effort between MC Router, Beefy, and Shael Riley.

As year 2007 began, Router released another new track entitled Trekkie Pride, which is known as "The First Nerdcore Song of 2007".

Conversion to Islam 
Ritchie converted to Islam and changed her given name from Kristin to Abedah, which means "Worshiper of God" in Arabic, sometime shortened to "Abby". She said in an interview with Muglatte that before Islam she was a Christian but never took religion seriously. She also said that she converted to Islam because she found logic in it.

On March 3, 2014, she appeared on the Dr. Phil show with her mother, Darlene, who was concerned about her daughter's new Islamic beliefs.

References 

1986 births
American Muslims
American women rappers
Living people
Nerdcore artists
Rappers from Texas
21st-century American rappers
21st-century American women musicians
American expatriates in the Netherlands
American former Christians
Converts to Islam from Christianity
21st-century women rappers